Yugoslav Third League (Serbo-Croat: 3. Savezna liga, 3. Савезна лига) was the third tier football league of SFR Yugoslavia. The top clubs were promoted to the second tier, the Yugoslav Second League.

The Yugoslav Third League was played only in season 1950. In the period before and after 1950 the league system was different and a Yugoslav Third League never existed as such.

League format
League was unified, comprising twelve teams.

Seasons

Yugoslav Inter-Republic League
In 1988, Inter-Republic Leagues were introduced as a third tier between Yugoslav Second League and Republic Leagues.

Seasons

References

3
Yugo
Yugo
Yugo
Yugo
Yugo
3
3
3
3
3
Defunct third level football leagues in Europe